Heidegger, Strauss, and the Premises of Philosophy: On Original Forgetting is a book by Richard Velkley, in which the author examines the philosophical relationship between Martin Heidegger and Leo Strauss.
It has been translated into French and Chinese.

References

External links 
 Heidegger, Strauss, and the Premises of Philosophy: On Original Forgetting

2011 non-fiction books
Books by Richard Velkley
Books in political philosophy
English-language books
University of Chicago Press books
Works about Leo Strauss
Works about Martin Heidegger